The Roland TR-707 Rhythm Composer is a drum machine released by the Roland Corporation in 1985.

Features
The TR-707 has fifteen digitally sampled sounds. The instrument is capable of 10-voice polyphony. The alternate bass drum, snare, and hi-hat sounds cannot be triggered simultaneously. The instruments are labeled as Bass Drum, Snare Drum, Low Tom, Mid Tom, Hi Tom, Rimshot, Cowbell, Hand Clap, Tambourine, Hi-Hat (Closed or Open), Cymbal (Crash or Ride), as well as an additional function labeled accent, which serves to rhythmically modify the volume of the other instruments.

The instruments on the TR-707 are samples of recordings of actual acoustic instruments and are not synthesized individually like the instruments on the TR-808.

The TR-707 provides four levels of shuffle that operate globally on the rhythm, as well as flam that can be applied to any step. The device offers 64 programmable patterns, which are editable via step-write or tap-write, that can be sequenced together into any of four different tracks. Patterns and tracks can be stored on the device (providing that two AA batteries are inserted) or onto an optional memory cartridge with twice the capacity.

The TR-707 is particularly sought after by users of Roland gear from the same era because it can synchronize with other hardware via both MIDI and DIN sync, although it cannot do so when controlled by other hardware. There is also an output that allows the Rimshot to trigger hardware that accepts a voltage pulse. There are individual volume sliders and output jacks for each instrument group.

Architecture 
While the TR-707 is a primarily digital device, it still employs some analog circuitry like envelopes and amplifiers.

The sounds where envelope circuits are used to contour the sounds are the Crash and Ride Cymbal, and the Hi-Hats. The Crash and Ride Cymbals are stored and replayed at 6-bit resolution whereas the other sounds are 8-bit samples. This low bit resolution significantly alters the dynamics of the original sounds resulting in very compressed sounds with an unnaturally long sustain. Envelope circuits were used here in an attempt to recreate an approximation the original dynamics of the sounds recorded.

These envelopes also play a role in reducing the quantization noise introduced by the low bit-rate used in the TR-707's circuits, particularly during the decay portion of sounds.

Both the open and closed Hi-Hat sounds are generated by the same sample stored in the ROM. When you trigger the closed Hi-Hat you actually trigger the open Hi-Hat sound that is then enveloped to sound like a short, closed cymbal hit. This approach eliminated the need to store two different Hi-Hat samples on individual EEPROMs. This was a smart and economical move by Roland as digital storage was very expensive at the time, thus allowing them to keep manufacturing costs down.

With the introduction of a 707/727 sound set for the Roland TR-8, Roland published an in-depth explanation of what causes a TR-707 unit to behave differently than a set of sampled sounds from the machine.

Legacy
The TR-707 was a staple in early house music, particularly with acid house. It is also a staple of almost all electronically produced Arabic pop music (al jeel). Because the TR-707 offers a limited number of instruments sampled at 8 bits, its sound is considered dated by modern standards. However, it is still in use because of its versatility in synchronizing with other hardware and its fully featured interface, comparable to that of high-end Roland drum machines such as the TR-808 and TR-909.

The TR-727 is visually identical aside from having blue highlights on the case, but it contains a different, Latin-inspired sample set. The TR-505 contains a subset of samples selected from the 707 and 727.

Songs that use the 707 include "Need You Tonight" by INXS, ''Move Your Body" by Marshall Jefferson and "Washing Machine" by Mr. Fingers.

References

External links
 Roland TR-707 Owner's Manual
 Synthmuseum: Roland TR-707

Drum machines
TR-707
Grooveboxes
TR-707
Musical instruments invented in the 1980s
Japanese inventions